Alexandrovka is a rural locality (a khutor) in Nizhnereutchansky Selsoviet Rural Settlement, Medvensky District, Kursk Oblast, Russia. Population:

Geography 
The khutor is located on the Reutets River (a left tributary of the Reut River in the Seym basin), 57 km from the Russia–Ukraine border, 37 km south-west of Kursk, 7 km south-west of the district center – the urban-type settlement Medvenka, at the northern border of the selsoviet center – Nizhny Reutets.

 Climate
Alexandrovka has a warm-summer humid continental climate (Dfb in the Köppen climate classification).

Transport 
Alexandrovka is located 9.5 km from the federal route  Crimea Highway (a part of the European route ), 2 km from the road of intermunicipal significance  (M2 "Crimea Highway" – Gakhovo), on the road  (38N-185 – Aleksandrowka), 28.5 km from the nearest railway halt and passing loop 454 km (railway line Lgov I — Kursk).

The rural locality is situated 45 km from Kursk Vostochny Airport, 91 km from Belgorod International Airport and 229 km from Voronezh Peter the Great Airport.

References

Notes

Sources

Rural localities in Medvensky District